César Thomson (18 March 1857 – 21 August 1931) was a Belgian violinist, teacher, and composer.

Biography

He was born in Liège in 1857. At age seven, he entered the Royal Conservatory of Liège, and studied under Désiré Heynberg, Rodolphe Massart and Jacques Dupuis (1830-1870). By age 16, he was considered to have "a technique unrivalled by any other violinist then living". He was also a student of Hubert Léonard, Henryk Wieniawski and Henri Vieuxtemps.

In 1873, he became concertmaster of the private orchestra (52 players) of Baron Paul von Dervies, a Russian banker and railroad magnate, who, in 1870, had built the Castello di Trevano as a temple to music, in the vicinity of Canobbio, by Lugano, Switzerland. After von Dervies lost his mind and disappeared, Thomson left Lugano in 1877, but not before he had married a local noblewoman, Luisa Riva. In 1879, he played in a Berlin orchestra, and in 1882 was appointed violin professor at his alma mater, the Liège Conservatory. In 1897, he succeeded Eugène Ysaÿe as principal professor at the Brussels Conservatory. In 1898, he established a string quartet, with himself as first violin.

He had great success as a concert soloist at Leipzig in 1891 and Brussels in 1898. His appearances in Britain and the United States were less favourably received, but he was popular in South America. He taught at Ithaca College in New York 1924-27 and at the Juilliard School.

César Thomson revived many of the then obscure works of Niccolò Paganini, and he did much work in editing, arranging and transcribing works from the early Italian school, by composers such as Corelli, Handel, Tartini, J. S. Bach, Nardini and Vitali. His own compositions included a Zigeuner Rhapsody for violin and orchestra (1909).

César Thomson died in Bissone, near Lugano, in 1931.

Honours 
 1919 : Commander of the Order of Leopold.

Students
His notable students included: Hugo Alfvén, Aylmer Buesst, Edwin Grasse, Johan Halvorsen, Paul Kochanski, Demetrius Dounis, Celia Torrá, Alma Moodie, Guillermo Uribe Holguín,  and Haydn Wood. Thomson played an important role in training two significant American chamber groups, having taught three members of the Flonzaley Quartet and at least two of the Zoellner Quartet, which made its first European appearances at his private soirees.

Other
There is a Boulevarde César Thomson in Liège.

References

External links

Musicians from Liège
1857 births
1931 deaths
20th-century classical composers
Belgian classical violinists
Male classical violinists
Belgian classical composers
Belgian male classical composers
Royal Conservatory of Liège alumni
Academic staff of the Royal Conservatory of Liège
Academic staff of the Royal Conservatory of Brussels
Violin pedagogues
20th-century Belgian male musicians